Adelaide City Park is a multi-use stadium in Adelaide, Australia. It is mainly used for Association football and has been the home ground for Adelaide City since 2004. The stadium has a capacity of 5,500 people. The ground was used by National Rugby League Adelaide Rams as a training base and headquarters, and was known as Ram Park, from 1997 until 1998 when the club went defunct.

References

External links
Official Website of Adelaide City
Soccerway page

Soccer venues in South Australia